Elke Dietze is a former West German slalom canoeist who competed at the international level in 1979.

She won a silver medal in the K1 team event at the 1979 ICF Canoe Slalom World Championships in Jonquière.

References

West German female canoeists
Living people
Year of birth missing (living people)
Medalists at the ICF Canoe Slalom World Championships